The Zenit-2 is a Ukrainian, previously Soviet, expendable carrier rocket. First flown in 1985, it has been launched 37 times, with 6 failures. It is a member of the Zenit family of rockets and was designed by the Yuzhmash.

History
With 13–15 ton payload in LEO, it was intended as up-middle-class launcher greater than 7-ton-payload middle Soyuz and smaller than 20-ton-payload heavy Proton. Zenit-2 would be certified for crewed launches and placed in specially built launch pad at Baykonur spaceport, carrying the new crewed partially reusable Zarya spacecraft that developed in end of the 1980s but was cancelled. Also in the 1980s Vladimir Chelomey's firm proposed the never realised 15-ton Uragan spaceplane, which would have been launched by Zenit-2.

A modified version, the Zenit-2S, is used as the first two stages of the Sea Launch Zenit-3SL rocket. Launches of Zenit-2 rockets are conducted from Baikonur Cosmodrome Site 45/1. A second pad, 45/2, was also constructed, but was only used for two launches before being destroyed in an explosion. A third pad, Site 35 at the Plesetsk Cosmodrome was never completed, and work was abandoned after the dissolution of the Soviet Union.

The Zenit-2 had its last flight in 2004; it has been superseded by the Zenit-2M, which incorporates enhancements made during the development of the Zenit-3SL. The Zenit-2 has a fairly low flight rate, as the Russian government usually avoids flying national-security payloads on Ukrainian rockets. Zenit-2M itself flew only twice: in 2007 and 2011.

During the late 1990s, the Zenit-2 was marketed for commercial launches. Only one such launch was conducted, with a group of Globalstar satellites, which ended in failure after a computer error resulted in the premature cutoff of the second stage.

The second stage, called the SL-16 by western governments, along with the second stages of the Vostok and Kosmos launch vehicles, makes up about 20% of the total mass of launch debris in Low Earth Orbit (LEO). An analysis that determined the 50 “statistically most concerning” debris objects in low Earth orbit determined that the top 20 were all SL-16 upper stages.

Launch history

References 

Vehicles introduced in 1985
Zenit (rocket family)

Spacecraft that broke apart in space